Provincial Highway 37 is a Taiwanese highway that starts from Xingang and ends in Lucao, both in Chiayi County. The highway connects THSR Chiayi Station with Chiayi City and Chiayi County, and runs along the underpass of the elevated viaduct for high-speed rail.

See also
 Highway system in Taiwan

References

External links

Highways in Taiwan